Gregor Jelonek (born 16 September 1968) is a Canadian speed skater. He competed in the men's 1500 metres event at the 1988 Winter Olympics. He went to the Olympics as a coach five times: Turin, Vancouver, Sotchi, PyeongChang and Pekin. His athlete, Laurent Dubreuil won the silver medal at the 2022 Olympics in the 1000m.

References

1968 births
Living people
Canadian male speed skaters
Olympic speed skaters of Canada
Speed skaters at the 1988 Winter Olympics
Speed skaters from Montreal